Independent Worm Saloon is the sixth album by alternative rock band Butthole Surfers, released in 1993 on Capitol Records. The band chose to follow a heavier orientation for most of the record, following the hiring of producer John Paul Jones, formerly of Led Zeppelin.

Track listing

Japanese CD reissue bonus tracks
 "Beat the Press" – 1:25
 "Ghandi" – 2:31
 "Neee Neee" – 4:31

These three bonus tracks were also included on a 10" vinyl promotional release sent to college radio stations.
"Ghandi" was later included on Humpty Dumpty LSD.

Personnel

Butthole Surfers
Gibby Haynes  – vocals, guitar
Paul Leary  – guitar, vocals (track 10), spoken word (track 4), "art master"
Jeff Pinkus  – bass, vocals & banjo (track 16)
King Coffey  – drums

Additional personnel
John Paul Jones  – producer, bass (track 16)
Pat McCarthy – engineer, mixer
Helios Creed  – guitar (tracks 12 & 17)
Heather Van Haaften – "art slave"

Charts
Album - Billboard (United States)

Singles - Billboard (United States)

Notes
 The vocals in "Some Dispute Over T-Shirt Sales" are similar to those in the Ministry song "Jesus Built My Hotrod," possibly as an intentional reference as vocalist Gibby Haynes sang the vocals on that song. However, "Some Dispute" had appeared in the band's set lists as far back as 1990 under the name "Watlo," roughly a year before Haynes' vocals were recorded for "Jesus Built My Hotrod."
 The song "Strawberry" ends with an extended sample of a man speaking Navajo, the same sample can be heard in Manowar's Spirit Horse of the Cherokee.

References 

1993 albums
Butthole Surfers albums
Capitol Records albums